Washington Peak at  above sea level is a peak in the White Cloud Mountains of Idaho. The peak is located in Sawtooth National Recreation Area in Custer County  from Fourth of July Peak, its line parent. It is the 264th highest peak in Idaho.

References 

Mountains of Custer County, Idaho
Mountains of Idaho
Sawtooth National Forest